Clare Boat Club is the rowing club for members of Clare College, Cambridge, it was founded in 1831.

Like other college boat clubs at the University of Cambridge, the prime constitutional aim of Clare Boat Club is to gain and hold the Headship of the Lent Bumps and May Bumps, now held in eight-oared boats, separately for men and women. In the May Bumps, Clare Men's 1st VIII rose to Head of the River in 1941 and held it until 1944, regaining the Headship again in 1949. Clare Women's 1st VIII started 1st in the first women's Lent Bumps in 1976 but did not gain the Headship. Clare retained Headship in the first women's May Bumps in 1974 and held it three more times in 1979, 1980 and 2013.

History
Clare Men's 1st VIII entered their first May Bumps race in 1831, achieving second place in the 1st Division by the end of 1832. They dropped steadily over the following decade, reaching an all-time low of forty-first in 1845, before the Mays boat reached fourth again in 1886, the year before the Lent races began. It was nearly 50 years before this position was reached again.

Prior to about 1930, the Clare Men's 1st VIII spent most of its time near the boundary of the 1st Division and 2nd Division of both the Lent and May Bumps charts. However, they did win Headship in the Lent Bumps competition of 1939. The Men's 1st VIII remained in the top ten of Lents until the 1960s, and returned to form in the early 1970s, taking the Headship again in 1973. Since then, they have spent most of their time in the 1st Division. In the May Bumps, the Men's 1st VIII rose to Head of the River in 1941. They held the Headship until 1944, regaining it again in 1949. Since then, the Men's 1st VIII has spent most of their time in the 1st Division, but, similar to the story of Lent Bumps, it has dropped into the 2nd Division on occasions. In 2015, the Men's 1st VIII finished eighth on the river in the 1st Division of May Bumps. This was the Men's 1st VIII's highest position in May Bumps for 27 years. In 2016 the Men's 1st VIII bumped up four places, winning Blades and attaining the College's highest place on the river for 46 years.

Clare Women's 1st VIII started 1st in the first ever women's Lent Bumps in 1976, but were unable to finish with the Headship. In Lent Bumps 2005, Clare Women's 1st VIII came very close to taking the Headship but  managed to cling onto it. However, the women did manage to win their first ever Lents Headship in 2006. In the first ever women's May Bumps in 1974, Clare started and retained their position of Head of the River. The Women's 1st VIII has since held the Headship in Mays on three further occasions, initially in 1979 and 1980; Clare regained the women's Headship in 2013, with the crew gaining Blades in the process. In 2015, Clare Women's 1st VIII finished sixth on the river in the 1st Division of May Bumps. In 2016 the Women's 1st VIII bumped up two places to finish fourth, in parity with the Men's 1st VIII.

Clare Novice Regatta
Clare Boat Club organises an annual regatta in November for novice College crews. It is run as a side-by-side regatta for eights, with a series of knockout races over a course of approximately 800m. In 2012, Clare Novice Men's 1st VIII not only won Clare Novice Regatta but also triumphed in Queens' Ergs and Emma Sprints. This was the first time in Clare Boat Club's history that a Men's VIII had won all three of these novice competitions in the same year.

Notable alumni
Sir Archibald Dennis Flower, represented Cambridge University and became Mayor of Stratford
David Jennens, represented Cambridge University and Great Britain
Charles Sergel, represented Cambridge University and Great Britain

Honours

Henley Royal Regatta

References

External links
 CUCBC/ Cambridge University Combined Boat Club
 Clare Boat Club

Rowing clubs of the University of Cambridge
Boat
Sports clubs established in 1831
1831 establishments in England
Rowing clubs in Cambridgeshire
Rowing clubs in England
Rowing clubs of the River Cam